Hsu Gi-sheng (born 2 January 1964) is a Taiwanese long-distance runner. He competed in the men's marathon at the 1996 Summer Olympics. He later became a coach at the National Taiwan Sport University.

References

1964 births
Living people
Athletes (track and field) at the 1996 Summer Olympics
Taiwanese male long-distance runners
Taiwanese male marathon runners
Olympic athletes of Taiwan
Place of birth missing (living people)
Athletes (track and field) at the 1998 Asian Games
Asian Games competitors for Chinese Taipei